Arabeem Ottakom P. Madhavan Nayarum in Oru Marubhoomikkadha (The Arab, the camel, and P. Madhavan Nair in a desert tale), or simply Oru Marubhoomikkadha, is a 2011 Indian Malayalam-language romantic comedy film directed by Priyadarshan and written by Abilash Nair. The film stars Mohanlal, Mukesh, Bhavana, Raai Laxmi and Shakti Kapoor. The film was a commercial success at the box office. Oru Marubhoomikkadha was the 200th film of Mukesh. This film was inspired from the 1997 Hollywood movies Nothing to Lose and Excess Baggage.

Plot
Puthanpurackal Madhavan Nair (Mohanlal) is a middle-aged businessman who has come to toil in the deserts of the Middle East to fulfill his responsibilities to his family of two younger sisters who must be married, and a father whose debt has to be paid. He has neither found the time to get married nor to have a life of his own.

One day, he meets Meenakshi (Raai Laxmi). They spend the day together and Meenakshi tells that she is going to get married. Meenakshi gives her number in a currency note and uses this money. Both leave with a heavy heart, but they finally meet up after some years when Madhavan gets the note. He learns that her marriage did not take place. The two get engaged.

One night, Madhavan finds someone with Meenakshi in the bedroom. He sees his boss Hossinni's (Shakti Kapoor) jacket on the couch. Overwhelmed with grief, he starts driving his car recklessly and is threatened by his childhood friend Abdu Kupleri (Mukesh), who had disguised as a thief. Madhavan tells Abdu that he was going to die and people who are a burden to the world should die and so Abdu has to die. However, the car is submerged in the desert sand. The car was dead and Abdu scolds Madhavan, who was ashamed about what happened, for all that happened. They find a car near the road.

Thoma (Nedumudi Venu) is a rich and miser businessman living in the city with his adopted daughter, Eliana (Bhavana), who gets kidnapped. The kidnappers call Thomas and ask for a ransom.

Meanwhile, Madhavan and Abdu finds Eliana, gagged in the car. They try to get rid of her and a series of funny events occur. Then Eliana reveals that she herself planned her kidnap as she needs money. But her plan is spoilt by them. She asks them to cooperate with her, otherwise she will have them arrested. Although Abdu agrees at once thinking of the money he will get, it takes some time to make Madhavan agree. They plan it all over again; this time asking more money for Madhavan and Abdu.

Eliana's uncle Jose (Maniyanpilla Raju) is a greedy man. He was planning to steal all the ransom money. He makes a deal with a local killer Mikha Singh to accomplish this and kill Eliana.

Madhavan, Abdu and Eliana stays in a wedding house and a series of confusion takes place when Thoma's driver Koya (Suraj Venjaramoodu) comes in search of Eliana. The trio finally escapes from the place. The day to fetch the money arrives. The plan is spoiled by Mikha, whom Jose collaborates with, and the police, called by Thoma. The trio manages to escape in a car but Eliana jumps from the moving car. She is taken to Abdu's house where his wife Khadeeja (Lakshmi Gopalaswamy) and their two children lives. Abdu is in debts and his threatened by the money-lenders. Eliana tells that she was going because she didn't want to trouble the two anymore. She reveals that her lover was in jail and had needed money to release him. Madhavan stops her and says that they will get the money by thieving his boss. He wanted to take his revenge. His boss trusted him and had given him the secret code to his locker at office.

Abdu and Madhavan breaks in at night wearing masks. They hides the CCTV camera with paper and steals the money. However, Madhavan loses his control and takes off the seal. He shouts back at the camera, removes his mask, vandalizes the room and calls his boss names. They finally escapes. Madhavan gets drunk and goes to Meenakshi's house and calls her names but is shocked to see two 'Meenakshi's. Meenakshi tells that the other one was Manasi, her twin sister and it was she and her husband who Madhavan saw that night. The boss had fallen into the pool at Madhavan's and Meenakshi's engagement and Meenakshi had given the jacket for laundry and it was returned in the evening on the same night Madhavan saw Manasi and her husband and Meenakshi had left the jacket on the couch. Madhavan realizes that Meenakshi still loves him.

On realizing his mistake, he goes back to Abdu and finds him gagged. Madhavan saves him and Abdu tells that Mikha had kidnapped Eliana. They saves Eliana and fights with Mikha and his men. Meanwhile, the police arrives. Eliana tells to them that it was Mikha who kidnapped and that Madhavan and Abdu saved her. Madhavan tells Abdu to leave back the money. They have a fight and Abdu tearfully and reluctantly gives it back which is returned to the locker.

Thoma is shocked when he finds out Jose was trying to kill Eliana. He reveals that his wealth was not his but an Arab's, who had helped Thoma when he reached Dubai. The Arab had died and his daughter was looked after by Thoma and that daughter was Eliana and so she inherits his wealth. He says that that was why he is a miser as the wealth was not his. Jose and Mikha gets arrested by the police. The next day, the boss is tearful to see his room vandalized. The CCTV visuals are checked. Madhavan is sure that he will lose his job. But the visuals had been tampered by Abdu. The movie ends with Madhavan paying back Abdu's debts with all the money-lenders and offering a good job in his company, Meenakshi and Eliana inviting Abdu and family to his marriage.

Cast
 Mohanlal as P. Madhavan Nair
 Mukesh as Abdu Kupleri
 Shakti Kapoor as Hosisini, Madhavan's Boss
Raai Laxmi as Meenanakshi and Manasi, Twin Sisters
 Bhavana as Eliana Thomas
Innocent as Mathay
Nedumudi Venu as Thomas Varghese, Eliana's father
Mamukkoya as Mammadkutty Bhai
Suraj Venjaramood as Koya, Mathai's Son-in Law
Sukumari as Moothumma, Abdu's mother
Maniyanpilla Raju as Jose, Thomas' Brother in Law
Lakshmi Gopalaswamy as Khadeeja, Abdu's Wife
Mini Arun as Mathai's wife
Sreenivasan as Narrator
Reshmi Boban as Jose's Wife
Assim Jamal as Kippa, a gangster

Production
Principal photography of the film began in Abu Dhabi in March 2011. On 16 March 2011, while filming in the desert in Abu Dhabi, Hollywood director James Cameron visited the set and had a three-hour long chat with Mohanlal, Priyadarshan and the crew. He was very much impressed with Mohanlal's acting prowess and Priyadarshan's use of limited crew.

The initial title of the film was Arabeem Ottakom P. Madhavan Nayarum but later the title was changed to Oru Maruboomikadha and finally to the current title. In the Persian Gulf region the film was released under the title Oru Marubhoomikadha. This was following tremendous pressure from NRIs in the Persian Gulf. There were reports that the Arabs were unhappy with the initial title and also hinted at banning the release of the film in the Middle East.

Soundtrack

The songs of this film were composed by playback singer and composer M. G. Sreekumar. The lyrics were penned by Bichu Thirumala, Santhosh Varma, and Rajeev Alunkal. Song mixing and re-recording premix were done by Renjith Viswanathan. The song "Gopa Balannishtam" is slight modified version of the song "Goruvanka Valagaane" which is composed by M. M. Keeravani for the movie Gandeevam.

Release and reception
The film was released on 16 December 2011. Rediff gave the rating of 3.75 out of 5 stars. It took a distributor's share of ₹3.85 crore in 25 days from Kerala box office. The film was a commercial success at the box office.

Awards and nominations
Nominations
 Filmfare Awards South - Mohanlal - Best Actor
 Kerala Film Critics Association Award For Best Lyrics - Rajeev Alunkal (Chembaka vallikalil)
 Kerala Film Critics Association Award For Best Music Director - M G Sreekumar (Chembaka Vallikalil)

References

External links
 

2010s Malayalam-language films
2011 films
Films set in the United Arab Emirates
Indian comedy films
2011 comedy films
Films set in Dubai
Films set in the Middle East
Films shot in Abu Dhabi
Films shot in the United Arab Emirates
Films directed by Priyadarshan